Adrian Gilbert Scott (6 August 1882 – 23 April 1963) was an English ecclesiastical architect.

Early life
Scott was the grandson of Sir Gilbert Scott (George Gilbert Scott), son of George Gilbert Scott, Jr. (founder of Watts & Company in 1874), nephew of John Oldrid Scott, and the younger brother to Sir Giles Gilbert Scott, all architects.

He was educated at Beaumont College, Old Windsor, as was his brother Giles, and designed the large war memorial still in the grounds of the college. He assisted his brother on a range of projects, including Liverpool Anglican Cathedral.

Career
His early work includes his design of the school chapel at Mount St Mary's College in Spinkhill, South Yorkshire, which was completed in 1924, St Joseph RC Church, Harrow (1929–31) and the RC Church of Our Lady of Beauchief & St Thomas in Sheffield in 1932.

His work on the Anglican Cathedral in Cairo began in 1933 and it was consecrated in 1938. This building was demolished in 1978 to make way for the building of a new Nile bridge (see Episcopal Church in Jerusalem and the Middle East).

Scott embraced gothic and modernist designs, and he travelled to Canada in the course of his work. The design of St James' Anglican Church in Vancouver is a combination of Art Deco, Romanesque Revival, Byzantine Revival, and Gothic Revival architecture. The walls are made of reinforced concrete, and the floor features an hydronic heating system.  The building was constructed between 1935 and 1937 and consecrated in 1938.

He started work on an altar at Saint Augustine Church in 1938; as of 2006, it is unfinished. He is also remembered for his design of the tower at The Holy Name Church Manchester.

He was also responsible for the design of St Mary and St Joseph Roman Catholic Church on the post-war Lansbury Estate in Poplar, East London, which has architectural similarities to St James', Vancouver. On the Wirral he designed St Joseph's at Upton and had the principal responsibility (in collaboration with his brother Giles) for the design of the rebuilt St Leonard's Church, St Leonards-on-Sea, East Sussex (1953–61). The new building at Aylesford Priory (1958-1965) is his work too.

Works

References

Bibliography

 Role in the building of Liverpool Metropolitan RC Cathedral
Work in Canada
SS Mary and Joseph Roman Catholic Church described in the Survey of London
Parks & Gardens UK

20th-century English architects
Architects of cathedrals
English ecclesiastical architects
Adrian Gilbert
1882 births
1963 deaths
People educated at Beaumont College
Architects from Berkshire